Lady Caroline Lamb (née Ponsonby; 13 November 1785 – 25 January 1828) was an Anglo-Irish aristocrat and novelist, best known for Glenarvon, a Gothic novel. In 1812 she had an affair with Lord Byron, whom she described as "mad, bad, and dangerous to know". Her husband was The Hon. William Lamb, who after her death became British prime minister.

Family background
She was the only daughter of Frederick Ponsonby, 3rd Earl of Bessborough, an Anglo-Irish peer, and Henrietta, Countess of Bessborough. She was known as the Honourable Caroline Ponsonby until her father succeeded to the earldom in 1793. While her brother, Frederick Cavendish Ponsonby, was severely injured in the Battle of Waterloo, in the days after the battle she had an affair with the Duke of Wellington. She was related to other leading society ladies, being the niece of Georgiana Cavendish, Duchess of Devonshire, and cousin (by marriage) of Annabella, Lady Byron. She was related to Sarah Ponsonby, one half of the Ladies of Llangollen, and Diana, Princess of Wales.

She was never Viscountess Melbourne because she died before Melbourne succeeded to the peerage.

Youth and education

As a small child she was considered delicate and for her health spent much time in the country. She travelled with her mother and other family to Italy, where she made an agonizing recovery from an illness caused by worms that nearly ended her life. After returning with her mother to England, she rejoined a lively menage of children who lived at Devonshire House and Roehampton, her cousins, the children of William Cavendish, 5th Duke of Devonshire: by his first marriage, to Lady Georgiana Spencer, three children, Lady Georgiana ("Little G"), Lady Harriet Cavendish ("Hary-o"), and Lord Hartington ("Hart", later the 6th Duke of Devonshire); and by his mistress and second wife, Lady Elizabeth Foster, two children, Augustus Clifford and Caroline St Jules, later wife of George Lamb (politician and writer). During childhood, she became particularly close to Lady Harriet, who was only three months older. Her behaviour grew increasingly troublesome to her family, she experimented with sedatives like laudanum and had a special governess to control her.

Lady Morgan reported in her memoirs that Lady Caroline told her that she had grown up as a tomboy, and was quite unable to read or write until adolescence. 
As a child Lady Caroline considered being able to wash a dog one of her most satisfying accomplishments. While many scholars have accepted this (and other melodramatic claims made by Lady Morgan) at face value, published works of correspondence about her family members make it extremely unlikely.  The grandmother she shared with her Cavendish cousins, the formidable Dowager Lady Spencer, was zealously dedicated to promoting education, and later employed their governess as her own companion.  This governess was Miss Selina Trimmer, the daughter of Mrs Sarah Trimmer, a well-known and respected author of moral tales for children.  She taught them an extensive curriculum, considerably beyond mere literacy.  There is a published letter Lady Caroline wrote on 31 October 1796 (just before her eleventh birthday) that not only demonstrates her literacy, but shows a merciless wit and talent for mimicry.

Lady Caroline was exceptionally well educated at home. She also attended a school in Hans Place, Knightsbridge, London, the successor to Reading Abbey Girls' School, where she was taught by Frances Arabella Rowden. Rowden was not only a published poet, but, according to another pupil, Mary Russell Mitford, "she had a knack of making poetesses of her pupils".

In her early adult years, Lady Caroline not only wrote prose and poetry, but also took to sketching portraiture.  These courtly skills stood her in good stead.  She spoke French and Italian fluently, was skilled at Greek and Latin, and also enjoyed music and drama.

Marriage and family

In June 1805, at the age of nineteen, Lady Caroline Ponsonby married the Hon. William Lamb, an up-and-coming politician, and heir to the 1st Viscount Melbourne.  Although their meeting had been shrewdly orchestrated by William Lamb's mother, theirs was a love match. The couple had become "mutually captivated" during a visit to Brocket Hall in 1802 and for many years the pair enjoyed a happy marriage. In 1809 his brother George married her namesake cousin Caroline St Jules.

Caroline gave birth to a stillborn child in January 1806, and then she and William produced a son, George Augustus Frederick, born on 11 August 1807, and a premature daughter, born in 1809 who died within 24 hours. Lady Caroline was physically ill-suited to childbirth and suffered long recovery periods after each one.

Her son was born with severe mental problems. Although most aristocratic families typically sent such relatives to institutions, the Lambs cared for their son at home until his eventual death in 1836, eight years after Lady Caroline's death. The stress of their son's ill health, combined with William Lamb's consuming career ambitions, drove a wedge between the couple. A further difficulty was that William's brothers and sister, a very close-knit clan, all detested Caroline, whom they called  "the little beast", while she and her mother-in-law hated each other from the start, and their lifelong enmity was to be a great cause of unhappiness to Caroline.

Lord Byron
From March to August 1812, Lady Caroline embarked on a well-publicised affair with Lord Byron. He was 24, she 26. She spurned his attention on their first meeting, which was at a society event at Holland House. According to the memoirs of her friend Sydney, Lady Morgan, Lady Caroline claimed she coined the phrase "mad, bad, and dangerous to know" soon after meeting the poet. It became his lasting epitaph, but there is no contemporary evidence to prove that she coined the famous phrase at the time. She wrote him a fan letter; his response was to visit her because of her high social status, and then to pursue her passionately.

Lady Caroline and Lord Byron publicly decried each other as they privately pledged their love over the following months. Byron referred to Lamb as "Caro", which she adopted as her public nickname. After Byron broke things off, her husband took the disgraced and desolated Lady Caroline to Ireland. The distance did not cool Lady Caroline's interest in the poet; she and Byron corresponded constantly during her exile. When Lady Caroline returned to London in 1813, however, Byron made it clear he had no intention of restarting their relationship. This spurred increasingly public attempts to reunite with her former lover. Matters came to a head at a ball in honour of the Duke of Wellington when Byron publicly insulted Lady Caroline, who responded by breaking a wine glass and trying to slash her wrists. She did not seriously injure herself and it is most unlikely that she had any suicidal intentions, but polite society was scandalised, and her mental stability was called into question. Byron himself referred to it as a theatrical performance: "Lady Caroline performed the dagger scene" (a reference to Macbeth).

Lady Caroline's obsession with Byron would define much of her later life, as well as influencing both her and Byron's works. They would write poems in the style of each other, about each other, and even embed overt messages to one another in their verse. After a thwarted visit to Byron's home, Lady Caroline wrote "Remember Me!" into the flyleaf of one of Byron's books. He responded with the hate poem: "Remember thee! Remember thee!; Till Lethe quench life's burning stream; Remorse and shame shall cling to thee, And haunt thee like a feverish dream! Remember thee! Ay, doubt it not. Thy husband too shall think of thee! By neither shalt thou be forgot, Thou false to him, thou fiend to me!"

Her cousin Harriet (by then Lady Granville), with whom Lady Caroline's relationship had deteriorated after childhood, visited her in December 1816 and was so incredulous at her unrepentant behaviour that she ended her description of the visit in a letter to her sister with: "I mean my visits to be annual."

Literary career

Lady Caroline Lamb was noted to have been involved in a few different literary circles that met in the Holland House, Lady Charleville's, Lord Ward's, Lord Lansdowne's, and others of similar repute.

Lady Caroline's most famous work is Glenarvon, a Gothic novel that was released in 1816 just weeks after Byron's departure from England. Although published anonymously, Lady Caroline's authorship was an open secret. It featured a thinly disguised pen-picture of herself and her former lover, who was painted as a war hero who turns traitor against Irish nationalism. The book was notable for featuring the first version of the Byronic hero outside of Byron's own work as well as a detailed scrutiny of the Romantic Period and, more specifically, the Ton. Lady Caroline included scathing caricatures of several of those prominent society members. One of them, the Countess of Jersey, cancelled Lady Caroline's vouchers to Almack's in retribution for her characterisations. This was the opening salvo in a backlash that found Lady Caroline blackballed from fashionable society: although her sister-in-law, Emily Lamb, Countess Cowper, got Lady Caroline readmitted to Almack's in 1819, her reputation never fully recovered.

Byron responded to the novel; "I read Glenarvon too by Caro Lamb….God damn!" The book was a financial success that sold out several editions but was dismissed by critics as pulp fiction. However, Goethe deemed it worthy of serious literary consideration.

In 1819, Lady Caroline put her ability to mimic Byron to use in the narrative poem "A New Canto." Years before, Lady Caroline had impersonated Byron in a letter to his publishers to have them send her a portrait of Byron. It worked; the tone and substance of her request fooled them into sending the painting. She used that skill to respond to Byron's "Don Juan I and II". Lady Caroline was most concerned with those allusions Byron had made about her; for example, the line "Some play the devil—and then write a novel" from "Don Juan II". In "A New Canto", Lady Caroline wrote – as Byron – "I'm sick of fame; I'm gorged with it; so full I almost could regret the happier hour; When northern oracles proclaimed me dull." Byron never publicly responded to the poem. A reviewer of the time opined, in part; "The writer of this lively nonsense has evidently intended it as an imitation of Lord Byron.  It is a rhapsody from beginning to end."

Lady Caroline published three additional novels during her lifetime: Graham Hamilton (1822), Ada Reis (1823), and Penruddock (1823).

Later life and death
Byron's confidante and close friend was his wife's maternal aunt, William Lamb's own mother, the colourful Elizabeth Lamb, Viscountess Melbourne. Lady Melbourne had been instrumental in bringing about the politically advantageous marriage of her son to Lady Caroline, despite disliking both her and her mother.

However, once Lady Caroline began her affair with Byron, her mother-in-law began a long and blatant campaign to rid her son of his wife; as Lord David Cecil remarks, she had long since concluded that Caroline deserved all her misfortunes. William Lamb refused to submit and regretted that his mother had conspired against his wife with Byron. Calling Byron treacherous, William Lamb was supportive of his wife to her death.

Ultimately, it was Lady Caroline who prevailed on her husband to agree to a formal separation in 1825. Both parties had had numerous extramarital affairs by that time and Lamb had long been known to eschew duplicity. She took up permanent residence at Brocket Hall. Her struggle with mental instability became more pronounced in her last years, complicated by her abuse of alcohol and laudanum. By 1827, she was under the care of a full-time physician as her body, which had always been frail, began to shut down and she retained fluids (a condition then known as dropsy, and now known as oedema). William Lamb was Chief Secretary for Ireland by that time and made a perilous crossing to be by her side when Lady Caroline died on 25 January 1828.

Lady Caroline was buried in the graveyard of St Etheldreda's church in Hatfield; her husband was later buried within the church.

In culture

In 1972, the film Lady Caroline Lamb was released with Sarah Miles in the lead role and Richard Chamberlain as Byron.

In 2003, the BBC broadcast Byron with Jonny Lee Miller in the title role and Camilla Power as Lady Caroline Lamb.

The 1905 novel The Marriage of William Ashe by Mary Augusta Ward was based on Lady Caroline and her husband.

The 1964 historical novel This for Caroline by Doris Leslie is based on her life.

In the 1971 novel Flash for Freedom! by George MacDonald Fraser, the lead character Harry Flashman names an African woman, taken as a slave, "Caroline Lamb."

The New York City band Glenarvon took their name from Lamb's novel of the same name.

References

Further reading 
Douglass, Paul (2004). Lady Caroline Lamb: A Biography. Palgrave Macmillan.
Douglass, Paul (2006). The Whole Disgraceful Truth: Selected Letters of Lady Caroline Lamb. Palgrave-Macmillan.
Douglass, Paul; Dickson, Leigh Wetherall (2009). The Collected Works of Lady Caroline Lamb. Pickering & Chatto.

External links 

 'CARO: The Lady Caroline Lamb Website:  “Mad, Bad, and Dangerous to Know”?'
 Lamb's 'New Canto'
 

1785 births
1828 deaths
Burials in Hertfordshire
Caroline Lamb
Daughters of Irish earls
Lord Byron
Women of the Regency era
18th-century British people
18th-century Irish women
19th-century British novelists
19th-century English women writers
19th-century British writers
English women novelists
Writers of Gothic fiction